Khotyn National Nature Park is a national park of Ukraine that covers a segment of the Dniester River Canyon and the Dniester River Reservoir.  It is located in the west of the country on the border with Romania.  The famous Khotyn Fortress is located within the territory.  The park is administratively in Dnistrovskyi Raion of Chernivtsi Oblast.

Topography
The park stretches for 160 km along the Dniester River.  The geology of the Dniester Canyon, cut into the surrounding plateau, includes granite and gneisses up to 2,000 million years old, as well as sedimentary and limestone rocks of the more recent Cenozoic (10-12 million years).  The karst landscape in places supports numerous caves.

Climate and ecoregion
The climate of Khotyn is Humid continental climate, warm summer (Köppen climate classification (Dfb)). This climate is characterized by large swings in temperature, both diurnally and seasonally, with mild summers and cold, snowy winters.

Flora and fauna
Because of the variety of terrain, habitat, and micro-climates in the park, plant and animal diversity is very high.  Over 1,500 species of vascular plants have been recorded in the area, 57 species of fish, 187 species of birds, and 40 of mammals.

Public use
Besides the Khotyn Fortress, there are a wide variety of archaeological and cultural sites in the park.  Several developed excursion routes are available for hiking and ecological study.

See also
 National Parks of Ukraine

References

External links

National parks of Ukraine
Protected areas established in 2010
2010 establishments in Ukraine
Geography of Chernivtsi Oblast